

The great knot (Calidris tenuirostris) is a small wader. It is the largest of the calidrid species. The genus name is from Ancient Greek kalidris or skalidris, a term used by Aristotle for some grey-coloured waterside birds. The specific  tenuirostris  is from Latin tenuis "slender" and rostrum "bill".

Distribution
Their breeding habitat is tundra in northeast Siberia. They nest on the ground laying about four eggs in a ground scrape. They are strongly migratory wintering on coasts in southern Asia through to Australia. This species forms enormous flocks in winter. The species is recorded in low numbers in western Alaska most years, and has occurred as a vagrant in British Columbia, Oregon, West Virginia, and Maine.

Description

The great knot is the largest species of Calidris sandpiper, with its sister species, the red knot, being the next largest. This species has short dark legs and a medium-length thin dark bill. Breeding adults have mottled greyish upper parts with some rufous feathering. The face, throat and breast are heavily spotted black, and there are also some streaks on the rear belly. In winter the plumage becomes uniformly pale grey above. 
This bird is closely related to the more widespread red knot. In breeding plumage, the latter has a distinctive red face, throat and breast. In other plumages, the great knot can be identified by its larger size, longer bill, deeper chest, and the more streaked upper parts.

These birds forage on mudflats and beaches, probing or picking up food by sight. They mainly eat molluscs and insects.

The great knot is one of the species to which the Agreement on the Conservation of African-Eurasian Migratory Waterbirds (AEWA) applies.

Conservation status

Australia 
Great knot are not listed as threatened on the Environment Protection and Biodiversity Conservation Act 1999.

State of Victoria, Australia 
 Great knot are listed as threatened on the Victorian Flora and Fauna Guarantee Act (1988).  Under this Act, an Action Statement for the recovery and future management of this species has not been prepared.

 On the 2013 advisory list of threatened vertebrate fauna in Victoria, this species is listed as endangered.

References

External links 

Oiseaux Photos

great knot
Wading birds
Birds of North Asia
great knot
Articles containing video clips
Taxa named by Thomas Horsfield